College of the Savior (formerly ) is a private Catholic primary and secondary school located in Zaragoza, Aragon, Spain. The school was founded by the Society of Jesus in 1879. It includes primary through baccalaureate.

Academics
Colegio del Salvador is a Jesuit school located in the Romareda neighborhood of Zaragoza. Construction began in 1877.

The school has two classrooms dedicated to students who suffer from a communication and relationship disorders, like autism.

In 2013 the school won the National Award for Education for Development "Vicente Ferrer" for its participation in Global Solidarity Week which focuses on global citizenship, solidarity, commitment to the eradication of poverty and its causes, and human and sustainable development.

Notable students and staff

Álvaro Arbeloa - footballer
Xabier Arzalluz - politician

Luis Buñuel - filmmaker
Ander Herrera - footballer
Longinos Navás - naturalist, botanist and Spanish entomologist
María Teresa Fernández de la Vega - politician

See also

 Catholic Church in Spain
 Education in Spain
 List of Jesuit schools

References  

Buildings and structures in Zaragoza
Education in Aragon
Jesuit secondary schools in Spain
Jesuit primary schools in Spain
 Educational institutions established in 1879
1879 establishments in Spain